Russia competed at the 1994 Winter Paralympics in Lillehammer, Norway. 27 competitors from Russia won 30 medals, 10 gold, 12 silver and 8 bronze, and finished 5th in the medal table.

See also 
 Russia at the Paralympics
 Russia at the 1994 Winter Olympics

References 

1994
1994 in Russian sport
Nations at the 1994 Winter Paralympics